Olivia Maeve Smith (born 1988) is an American journalist. Smith has worked for ABC News and Good Morning America, including as a coordinating producer and reporter. Smith is currently the Executive Producer of Next Generation Storytelling at KABC-TV Channel 7 in Los Angeles, California.

Smith won an Emmy Award in 2016 in the category of News & Documentary for the documentary Dead Horse Bay: New York’s Hidden Treasure Trove of Trash. Smith was also nominated for an Emmy Award in 2018 as a television correspondent in the category of Outstanding News Special for ABC network's special report The Great American Eclipse. Smith won another Emmy Award in 2017 as part of the team with Good Morning America.

Smith is an adjunct professor at the University of Southern California.

Smith is the creator and founder of the blog Get Savvy With Social.

In August 2019, Smith married Michael P. Murray.

References

External links 
 

American television journalists
1988 births
Living people
American women television journalists
ABC News people
21st-century American journalists
21st-century American women